The Sovereign 30 is an American trailerable sailboat that was designed by the Sovereign Design Group as a cruiser and first built in 1998.

The Sovereign 30 is a development of the Sovereign 28.

Production
The design was built by Sovereign America in the United States, starting in 1998, with only one prototype built, before the company went out of business. The prototype was used as a factory demonstrator and was eventually sold to a private owner.

Design
The Sovereign 30 is a recreational keelboat, built predominantly of fiberglass, with wood trim. It is a cutter rigged sloop with a center cockpit, a raked stem, a plumb transom, an internally mounted spade-type rudder controlled by a wheel and a fixed fin keel. It displaces  and carries  of ballast.

The design has a bow and a stern cabin. The galley is equipped with a two-burner alcohol-fired stove and an ice box. The head is fully enclosed and includes a shower.

The boat can be transported on a three-axle trailer with surge brakes.

See also
List of sailing boat types

References

Keelboats
1990s sailboat type designs
Sailing yachts
Trailer sailers
Sailboat type designs by Sovereign Design Group
Sailboat types built by Sovereign Yachts